"Tighten Up" is a song by American rock band The Black Keys. It is the third track on their 2010 album Brothers and was released as the record's first single on April 23, 2010.

The song has become one of the most successful Black Keys singles in the United States, being their first song to chart on the Billboard Hot 100 and reaching number one on the Alternative Songs and Rock Songs charts. Rolling Stone put the song on its list of the 15 Best Whistling Songs of All Time. At the 53rd Grammy Awards in 2011, the song won Best Rock Performance by a Duo or Group with Vocal (the last song to receive the award), while also receiving a nomination for Best Rock Song. Musically, the song is in the key of F sharp minor.

Music video
The original music video for the song was a low-budget clip starring a puppet dinosaur named Frank who is standing beside a plant. The video shows him dancing and miming the words a little, whilst subtitles go on saying different facts about the video, the band, and Frank; e.g. "Frank has a profile on eHarmony..." "He is a puppet, not a real dinosaur." This goes along the same direction of using sort of "obvious" or "simple" ways to say things like the album cover does; e.g. "This is a song by the Black Keys", "It's from an album called Brothers", etc. The video was made by director Chris Marrs Piliero as the label asked them to do a placeholder video for "Tighten Up" as a teaser for Brothers. Piliero was inspired by both  "stupid kid shit that could still be for adults, like Yo Gabba Gabba! and "all these weird and sometimes creepy old-school puppet stuff from the 50s, 60s, 70s.", considering at first an ALF doll before settling on the dinosaur. He later made a similar teaser video for "Next Girl", where Frank interacts with bikini-clad models.

The official music video, also directed by Piliero, was released on May 18, 2010. It shows Auerbach and his fictional son walking to the park. Auerbach sits next to Carney on a bench while their fictional sons play with toy trucks. Auerbach's son looks up on the playground to see a little girl, after which he starts to lip sync to the song. He climbs up on the playground and goes in to kiss her but then he opens his eyes to realize Carney's son has lured her away. After he attempts to kiss her, the two boys begin to fight. After Auerbach and Carney attempt in vain to break up the fight, they see the mother of the girl, played by Spanish actress Carlotta Elektra Bosch, and begin to fight like their sons. They hit each other using mostly Carney's drum kit and after the woman sees them fighting, she walks away in disgust. Their boys come to them and shake their heads at them with disappointment.

The official music video won the 2010 MTV Video Music Award for Breakthrough Video, and it appears on Pitchfork's top music videos of 2010.

Charting
On the week ending November 6, 2010, "Tighten Up" debuted at number 93 on the Billboard Hot 100. It re-entered at number 87 on the week ending January 22, 2011. The single also achieved early success on rock radio, hitting number one on both the Alternative Songs chart (for 10 weeks) and the Rock Songs chart (for 12 weeks).

Weekly charts

Year-end charts

Decade-end charts

Track listing
All songs written by The Black Keys.
"Tighten Up" – 3:30
"Howlin' for You" – 3:11

Personnel
The Black Keys
Dan Auerbach – guitars, vocals, keyboards, production on "Howlin' for You"
Patrick Carney – drums, percussion, production on "Howlin' for You"

Additional musicians
Nicole Wray – backing vocals on "Howlin' for You"

Technical personnel
Tchad Blake – mixing
Danger Mouse at The Bunker, Brooklyn, NY – production
Brian Lucey at Magic Garden Mastering – mastering
Mark Neil at Muscle Shoals Sound Studio – engineering and production on "Howlin' for You"
Kennie Takahashi – engineering on "Tighten Up"

Usage in media
"Tighten Up" has been licensed to appear in EA Sports game FIFA 11, the musical video games Rocksmith, Rock Band 3 (as downloadable content for both) and Guitar Hero Live, the TV series Gossip Girl, a Subaru commercial, a Molson commercial, and the films I Am Number Four, Bad Teacher, and Spring Breakers.

In 2015, a cover by Justin Young was used in the sci-fi TV series The Expanse, in the first episode of season 1, "Dulcinea". The lyrics of the song were translated to the Belter Creole, a constructed language made for the TV series by Nick Farmer, that was spoken in the show by Belters, the inhabitants of the asteroid belt and outer planets. The full version of the song was later song was placed on the TV series The Collector's Edition version of the soundtrack, that was realized on December 13, 2019.

See also
List of number-one alternative rock singles of 2010 (U.S.)

References

2010 singles
The Black Keys songs
Songs written by Dan Auerbach
Songs written by Patrick Carney
Music videos directed by Chris Marrs Piliero
2010 songs
Song recordings produced by Danger Mouse (musician)
Nonesuch Records singles